Ali Cook (also credited as Alistair Cook) is an English magician, actor and comedian originating from Yorkshire. Cook played Sgt. Paul McMellon in the feature film Kajaki, which won the Producer of The Year Award at the 2015 British Independent Film Awards and was nominated for a British Academy of Film and Television Arts Award in 2015.

Cook's career started on the Channel 5 sketch series, The Jerry@Trick show with the alternative comedians Jerry Sadowitz, Phil Nichol and Boothby Graffoe. Andrew Newman, then the head of comedy at Five, spotted Cook during tapings which lead to him writing and starring in seven of his own comedy and Magic series for Channel 4, Channel 5, and Sky1. His Channel 4 Series Dirty Tricks was nominated for a British Comedy Award and The Golden Rose of Montreux.

He wrote and acted in the short film The Cunning Man, winner of the Arri Alexa short film competition which was long listed for a BAFTA and has currently won over 30 awards.

He regularly tours the UK and internationally with comedy promoters Off the Kerb in between acting commitments.

Television career
Cook began on Jerry Sadowitz's television sketch show Jerry@Trick Show before moving on to co-write and star in TV series, including Monkey Magic (UK TV series) (nominated for The Golden Rose of Montreux), Psychic Secrets Revealed with Derren Brown (both for Channel 5)and the Secret World of Magic for Sky One. 
Cook was the star of Channel 4's late night show Dirty Tricks (nominated for a British Comedy Award and The Golden Rose of Montreux). 
Cook starred in the first Penn & Teller: Fool Us (ITV) hosted by Jonathan Ross. In 2011 he performed his Houdini-style water Torture Escape on The Slammer (CBBC). He has also starred in the prestigious France 2 series Le Plus Grand Cabaret du monde produced by Magic. Recent television credits include: Ragdoll for AMC, Mr Selfridge, the role of  the villainous Patrick in multiple episodes of Emmerdale in 2016 and  The ABC Murders in 2018.

Television
 2002 The Jerry@trick Show, Ronin Entertainments, Channel 5
 2002 Monkey Magic, Objective Productions, Channel 5
 2003 Psychic, Objective Productions, Channel 5
 2003 Monkey Magic Two, Objective Productions, Channel 5
 2004 Secret World of Magic, Objective Productions, Sky One
 2005 Dirty Tricks, Objective Productions, Channel 4
 2010 Talk of the Terrace, ESPN
 2011 Penn & Teller: Fool Us, September Films, ITV1
 2011 The Slammer, CBBC
 2011  Le Plus Grand Cabaret du monde, Magic, France 2
 2013 Mr Selfridge, ITV1
 2016 Emmerdale, ITV1 (multiple episodes) 
 2018 The ABC Murders (TV series), BBC 1
 2021 Ragdoll, AMC

Film
Cook portrayed Sgt. Paul "Spud" McMellon in 2014's Kajaki, which won the Producer of The Year Award at the 2015 British Independent Film Awards and was nominated for a British Academy of Film and Television Arts Award in 2015.

Cook stars alongside Katherine Parkinson and Jay Pharoah in 2018's How To Fake A War, directed by Rudolph Herzog and produced by Film and Music Entertainment.

Other recent credits include: Twist for Sky Cinema, The Obscure Life of the Grand Duke of Corsica starring Timothy Spall, Muscle directed by Gerard Johnson, In the Cloud directed by Robert Scott Wildes for Sony Pictures,  Once Upon a Time in London directed by Simon Rumley, and British Independent Film Awards nominated thriller Isolani.

In 2011 he appeared in Outside Bet, directed by Sacha Bennett, alongside Bob Hoskins, Phil Davis and Jenny Agutter. He has played the lead role in ten British short film dramas, most notably the psychotic character Greg in Andrew Saunder's and Stephen Frears' Striklem

In 2011, Cook was an executive producer on the feature film Dark Tide, starring Halle Berry.

Filmography

Feature films
2005 Sahara, Paramount Pictures, Breck Eisner
2012 Outside Bet, Gateway Films, Sacha Bennett
2013 Get Lucky, Gateway Films, Sacha Bennett
2014 Peterman, Control Films, Mark Abraham
2014 Lost In Karastan, Film and Music Entertainment, Ben Hopkins
2014 Kajaki, Pukka Films, Paul Katis
2015 The Messenger, Gateway Films, David Blair
2016 The Call Up, Stigma Films, Charles Barker
2016 Isolani, Lola Pictures, Paul Wilson
2017 Once Upon a Time in London, Zebra Films, Simon Rumley
2017 In the Cloud, Sony Pictures, Robert Scott Wildes
2018 How To Fake A War, Film and Music Entertainment, Rudolph Herzog
2018 Muscle, Stigma Films, Gerard Johnson
2021 Twist, Sky Original
2021 The Obscure Life Of The Grand Duke Of Corsica, Camelot Films
2022 Prezidentka, Marlene Film Productions

Short films
2019 The Cunning Man, Harvest Films

Theatre
Cook has written and performed three critically acclaimed sell-out Edinburgh solo shows: A Touch of Vegas (2008), Pieces of Strange (2010), and Principles and Deceptions (2011)
 Broadway Baby review 2010
 Chortle review 2011
 Broadway Baby review 2011

Stage
 2015, Stage, Impossible: London's Magic Spectacular, Jamie Hendry Productions, Noel Coward Theatre, London
 2011, Stage, One man show, Principles and Deceptions, Gilded Balloon, Edinburgh
 2010, Stage, One man show, Pieces of Strange, Gilded Balloon, Edinburgh
 2008, Stage, One man show, A Touch of Vegas, Gilded Balloon, Edinburgh

Further reading

Notes

External links
 
 Ali Cook on Instagram
 Ali Cook on Twitter

English magicians
English comedy writers
English male television actors
Living people
Year of birth missing (living people)